The eDumbe Local Municipality council consists of nineteen members elected by mixed-member proportional representation. Ten councillors are elected by first-past-the-post voting in ten wards, while the remaining nine are chosen from party lists so that the total number of party representatives is proportional to the number of votes received.

Results 
The following table shows the composition of the council after past elections.

December 2000 election

The following table shows the results of the 2000 election.

March 2006 election

The following table shows the results of the 2006 election.

May 2011 election

The following table shows the results of the 2011 election.

August 2016 election

The following table shows the results of the 2016 election.

No party obtained a council majority. Siyabonga Kunene of the African National Congress (ANC) was subsequently elected mayor and Nyanga Ndlangamandla of the Inkatha Freedom Party (IFP) was elected deputy mayor.

November 2021 election

The following table shows the results of the 2021 election.

After the election, the National Freedom Party (NFP) and the ANC formed an arrangement, with the NFP taking the mayor and speaker positions, and the ANC taking the deputy mayor and chief whip position.

References

eDumbe
Elections in KwaZulu-Natal
Zululand District Municipality